Dorota Nvotová (born 27 October 1982 in Považská Bystrica, Czechoslovakia) is a Slovak singer, actress, and journalist for the newspaper .týždeň. She is a daughter of actress Anna Šišková and musician Jaroslav Filip. She currently lives alternately in Slovakia and Nepal, where she leads hiking expeditions for tourists.

Filmography 
 Orbis Pictus (1997) .... Terezka
 Krajinka (2000) .... Paula
  Děvčátko (2002) .... Ema
 Perníková věž (2002) .... Věra
 O Život (2008) .... Zita
 Muzika (2008) .... Anča Prepichová
 Il Caso dell'infedele Klara (2009) .... Sandra
 Mŕtvola musí zomrieť (2011) .... Lívia
 The Confidant (2011)

Discography 
 Overground (2002)
 Dorota Nvotová (2004)
 Sila vzlyku (2008)
 Just! (2012)
 More (2018)
 Ten (2021)

Bibliography 
 Fulmaya (2014)

References

External links

 www.dorotanvotova.sk — official website

1982 births
Living people
People from Považská Bystrica
21st-century Slovak women singers
Slovak women television presenters